Corymbia bunites, commonly known as the Blackdown yellowjacket, is a species of tall tree that is endemic to Queensland. It has rough bark on the trunk and branches, lance-shaped or curved adult leaves, flower buds in groups of seven, white flowers and barrel-shaped, urn-shaped or spherical fruit.

Description
It has soft, rough, flaky yellowish or brownish bark on the trunk and branches.

Taxonomy and naming
The Blackdown yellowjacket was first formally described in 1991 by Ian Brooker and Anthony Bean in the journal Austrobaileya and given the name Eucalyptus bunites from specimens collected by Brooker on the Blackdown Tableland in 1972. In 1995, Ken Hill and Lawrie Johnson changed the name to Corymbia bunites. The specific epithet (bunites) is from an ancient Greek word meaning "hill dweller", referring to the habitat of this species.

Distribution and habitat
Corymbia bunites grows in shallow, sandy soil on sandstone hills and ridges. It has a disjunct distribution, mainly on the Blackdown Tableland but also on the Expedition Dawson, Bedourie and Shotover Ranges.

Conservation status
This eucalypt is classified as of "least concern" under the Queensland Government Nature Conservation Act 1992.

See also
 List of Corymbia species

References

bunites
Myrtales of Australia
Flora of Queensland
Plants described in 1991